On January 24, 2020, a building at Watson Grinding and Manufacturing in northwest Houston, Texas, United States, exploded at 4:24 a.m. Officials asked local residents to search for debris and body parts to assist with an investigation into the explosion's cause. An absence of zoning ordinances separating industrial areas from residences is known to prevail in the vicinity of the explosion.

Two deaths were reported on the morning of the incident. Both men were employees of Watson Grinding and Manufacturing. A third man, whose home was impacted by debris from the explosion, died from his injuries on February 5. Eighteen people "self reported" to emergency rooms for minor injuries. Forty-eight people sought shelter from Red Cross, and two schools in the vicinity were closed for the day. Some homes near the facility were blasted off their foundations, and some had collapsed ceilings, shattered windows, and bent garage doors.

Bureau of Alcohol, Tobacco, Firearms and Explosives personnel assisted the Houston Fire and Police Departments with the investigation. Multiple lawsuits have already been filed.

Watson Grinding and Manufacturing filed for bankruptcy in February 2020.

Cause
The cause was found to be a suspected gas leak from a  propylene tank.

See also
 List of 21st-century explosions

References

2020 disasters in the United States
2020 in Texas
2020 industrial disasters
Explosions in 2020
Explosions in the United States
Industrial accidents and incidents in the United States
January 2020 events in the United States